Events in the year 1824 in India.

Events

Law
Slave Trade Act (British statute)

Births
 12 February – Swami Dayanand Saraswati
 18 December – Lal Behari Dey, journalist (died 1892).

 
India
Years of the 19th century in India